G3: Genes, Genomes, Genetics (also styled as G3: Genes | Genomes | Genetics) is a peer-reviewed open-access scientific journal that focuses on rapid publication of research in the fields of genetics and genomics. It is published by the Genetics Society of America and was established in 2011. The journal is abstracted and indexed in MEDLINE and the Science Citation Index Expanded. The founding editor-in-chief is Brenda Andrews (University of Toronto).

See also
 Genetics

External links
 

Genetics journals
Creative Commons Attribution-licensed journals
Open access journals
English-language journals
Publications established in 2011
Monthly journals